Thomas Hartley Crawford (November 14, 1786 – January 27, 1863) was a Jacksonian member of the U.S. House of Representatives from Pennsylvania.

Thomas H. Crawford was born in Chambersburg, Pennsylvania.  He graduated from Princeton College in 1804.  He studied law, was admitted to the bar in 1807 and commenced practice in Chambersburg.

Crawford was elected as a Jacksonian to the Twenty-first and Twenty-second Congresses.  He was a member of the Pennsylvania House of Representatives in 1833 and 1834.  He was appointed a commissioner to investigate alleged frauds in the sale of the Creek Reservation in 1836.  He was appointed by President Martin Van Buren as commissioner of Indian Affairs and served from October 22, 1838, to October 30, 1845.  He was appointed by President James K. Polk as judge of the criminal court of the District of Columbia in 1845 and served until 1861, when the court was reorganized.  He died in Washington, D.C., in 1863.  He had his interment in the Congressional Cemetery.

Sources

The Political Graveyard

External links
 

1786 births
1863 deaths
People from Chambersburg, Pennsylvania
Jacksonian members of the United States House of Representatives from Pennsylvania
Members of the Pennsylvania House of Representatives
District of Columbia judges
Pennsylvania lawyers
Princeton University alumni
Burials at the Congressional Cemetery
19th-century American judges